Hatibandha is an upazila of Lalmonirhat District in the Division of Rangpur, Bangladesh.

Geography
It has 33369 households and total area 288.42 km2.

Demographics
As of the 1991 Bangladesh census, Hatibandha has a population of 172417. Males constitute 51.39% of the population, and females 48.61%. This Upazila's eighteen up population is 85064. Hatibandha has an average literacy rate of 21.4% (7+ years), and the national average of 32.4% literate.

Administration
Hatibandha Upazila is divided into 12 union parishads: Barokhata, Dawabari, Fakirpara, Goddimari, Gotamari, Nowdabas, Paticapara, Shaniajan, Sindurna, Singimari, Tongvhanga, and Vhelaguri. The union parishads are subdivided into 63 mauzas and 65 villages.

See also
Upazilas of Bangladesh
Districts of Bangladesh
Divisions of Bangladesh

References

Upazilas of Lalmonirhat District